Lawrence Robert Ward (born 27 March 1911) was a professional rugby league footballer in the Australian New South Wales Rugby League (NSWRL) competition in the 1930s, a state and national representative full-back.

Playing career
Originally from Goulburn, New South Wales, the fast and elusive back moved to Sydney in 1933, joined Eastern Suburbs and played 15 matches for the club.  Ward was selected to play for New South Wales in 1933 before leaving Sydney for Maitland where he played seasons 1934 & 1935. He was selected at full back for Country Firsts in the inaugural City v Country clash staged by CRL on 26 May 1934  and the following year was selected for the national side making his Test debut in 1935 on the tour of New Zealand playing in all three Tests of the tour. He is listed on the Australian Players Register as Kangaroo No. 196.

In 1937 captain-coached North Sydney and that season was selected for the 1937-38 Kangaroo tour playing in all seven Tests of the tour - three against England and two against each of New Zealand and France.

References

Published sources
 

1911 births
Possibly living people
Australia national rugby league team players
Australian rugby league coaches
Australian rugby league players
New South Wales rugby league team players
North Sydney Bears coaches
North Sydney Bears players
Rugby league fullbacks
Sydney Roosters players